Malcolm James Owens (born 30 January 1952) is a former Australian rules footballer who played with Melbourne in the Victorian Football League (VFL).

Notes

External links 

1952 births
Living people
Australian rules footballers from Victoria (Australia)
Melbourne Football Club players
Chelsea Football Club (Australia) players